Inanidrilus ernesti is a species of annelid worm. It is known from subtidal coarse sands in the Atlantic coast of Florida.

References

ernesti
Invertebrates of the United States
Taxa named by Christer Erséus
Fauna of the Atlantic Ocean
Animals described in 1984